Marmot Dome is the one dome east of Fairview Dome, linked by an area called Razor Back. It is near Pothole Dome.

On Marmot Dome's particulars

Rock climbing

Most rock climbing routes are north-facing slabs, so they early and late in the day they tend to be in the shade.

References

External links and references

 peakbagger.com on Marmot Dome
 One YouTube video

Granite domes of Yosemite National Park